Studying Children in Context: Theories, Methods, and Ethics is a 1998 book on qualitative research methods for working with young children. It was written by M. Elizabeth Graue and Daniel J. Walsh and published by SAGE Publications.

Notes

References 

 
 
 
 
 

1998 non-fiction books
Research methods
Qualitative research
English-language books